Heart & Soul is the forty-first studio album by American country music singer Conway Twitty. The album was released in 1980, by MCA Records.

Track listing

Charts

References

1980 albums
Conway Twitty albums
MCA Records albums